The Giles W. Dalby Correctional Institution is a privately operated prison located in Post, Garza County, Texas, operated by the Management and Training Corporation under contract with the state of Texas   The facility is owned by the county.  It opened in 1999, houses state detainees, and has a working capacity of 1776 

In August 2016, Justice Department officials announced that the FBOP would be phasing out its use of contracted facilities, on the grounds that private prisons provided less safe and less effective services with no substantial cost savings.  The agency expects to allow current contracts on its thirteen remaining private facilities to expire.

References

Prisons in Texas
Buildings and structures in Garza County, Texas
Management and Training Corporation
1999 establishments in Texas